J. W. Alexander may refer to:
 J. W. Alexander (musician) (1916–1996), American gospel and soul singer, producer and entrepreneur
 James Waddel Alexander (1804–1859), American Presbyterian minister and author
 John White Alexander (1856–1915), American portrait painter and illustrator
 James Waddell Alexander II (1888–1971), American mathematician and topologist

See also

James Alexander (disambiguation)
John Alexander (disambiguation)